is a Japanese manga artist. Yagami is known for writing Nanaka 6/17, serialized in Weekly Shonen Champion from 2001 to 2004.

Works
Arisa² (2004; Shonen Ace, Kadokawa Shoten)
Dokidoki Majo Shinpan! (2007; Champion Red, Akita Shoten)
Dokidoki Majo Shinpan! 2 (2008; Champion Red, Akita Shoten)
Futaba no Kyoushitsu (2006; Young Animal, Hakusensha)
Hisoka Returns! (1995; Weekly Shonen Jump, Shueisha)
Kirin: The Last Unicorn (1997; Weekly Shonen Jump, Shueisha)
Nanaka 6/17 (2001; Weekly Shonen Champion, Akita Shoten)

External links

1966 births
Living people
Manga artists from Hiroshima Prefecture
People from Hiroshima